Louis Alvarez (born January 23, 1955) and Andrew Kolker (born February 20, 1952) are American documentary filmmakers whose works deal with various aspects of American society and culture.  Their films have been shown frequently on the American Public Broadcasting Service and are notable for their use of humor in the examination of serious subjects such as social class and politics. Alvarez and Kolker's work has been recognized by two Peabody Awards and two Alfred I. duPont-Columbia University Awards.

Early life 
Alvarez and Kolker first met in New Orleans in the mid-1970s as activist videomakers working in the city's poor neighborhoods, and their earlier work portrays life in New Orleans and surrounding parishes.

Works 
Their best-known works are People Like Us: Social Class in America, which is a wide-ranging examination of the American class system from 2001,<ref>Baltimore Sun, Sept 23, 2001, '' Our Kind of People (Or Maybe Not)</ref> and American Tongues, a 1987 study of dialects of North American English and their social implications.  They have also collaborated with the filmmaker Paul Stekler on several films about American politics and culture, including Louisiana Boys - Raised on Politics and Vote for Me: Politics in America.

Between 1994 and 2014 Alvarez and Kolker collaborated with the film editor and producer Peter Odabashian on their films.

Filmography
 Changing the Channel, 1977
 Talking Crime, 1978
 The Clarks, 1979
 The Ends of the Earth: Plaquemines Parish, Louisiana, 1982
 El mosco y el agua alta, or Mosquitoes and High Water, 1983
 Yeah You Rite!, 1985
 American Tongues, 1987
 L.A. is It with John Gregory Dunne, 1990
 The Japanese Version, 1991
 Louisiana Boys—Raised on Politics, 1993
 Vote for Me: Politics in America, 1996
 MOMS, 1999
 People Like Us: Social Class in America, 2001
 Sex: Female, 2003
 Small Ball—A Little League Story, 2004
 The Anti-Americans (a hate/love relationship), 2007
 Past/Present [video game], 2012
 Getting Back to Abnormal, 2013
 Buckwheat's World, 2015
 Postcards from the Great Divide'', 2016

References

External links
 
 
 The Center for New American Media
 People Like Us website

1952 births
1955 births
American documentary filmmakers
Living people